This is a list of roads designated A11. Roads entries are sorted in the countries alphabetical order.

 A011 road (Argentina), a road connecting the junction of National Route 11 in Clorinda with Puerto Pilcomayo
 A11 road (Australia) may refer to :
 A11 highway (South Australia), a road connected to National Route A17 (Portrush Road), South Australia
 A11 motorway (Austria), a road connecting Austria with the Karawanken Tunnel to the A2 in Slovenia
 A11 motorway (Croatia), a road connecting Zagreb and Sisak
 A11 motorway (France), a road connecting Paris to Nantes
 A 11 motorway (Germany), a road connecting  Berlin and Szczecin
Motorway 11 (Greece), known as A11, a road connecting Chalkis and Shimatan
 A11 motorway (Italy), a road connecting Florence and Pisa Nord
 A11 road (Malaysia), a road in Perak
 A11 road (Latvia), a road connecting Liepāja and the Lithuanian border
 A11 highway (Lithuania), a road connecting Šiauliai and Palanga
 A11 road (People's Republic of China) may refer to :
 A11 expressway (Shanghai), a road connecting Zhenbei Road Interchange and Nanjing
 A11 motorway (Portugal), a road connecting Apúlia and Amarante
 A-11 motorway (Spain), a road connecting Soria and Quintanilha, Portugal
 A 11 road (Sri Lanka) a road connecting  Maradankadawala and Trikandimadu
 A11 expressway (Switzerland), a road connecting Zürich with its airport
 A11 road (United Kingdom) may refer to :
 A11 road (England), a road connecting London and Norwich
 A11 road (Isle of Man) or King Edward road
 A11 road (Northern Ireland) or Belfast Inner Ring Road
 A11 road (United States of America) may refer to :
 A11 County route (California), a road connecting Interstate 5 and CR A8
 A11 motorway (Romania), a road planned to connect Arad and Oradea

See also
 List of highways numbered 11